Artur Szmit is a former bass guitarist of Polish streetpunk band The Analogs. He had been playing for The Analogs in 1996, for then-imprisoned Paweł Czekała, and again for a short time in 1999.

References
  Analogs history on official website
  Band's official forum
  Jimmy Jazz Records

Year of birth missing (living people)
Living people
Polish bass guitarists
The Analogs members